Harvey Lewis Barnes (born 9 December 1997) is an English professional footballer who plays as a winger for  club Leicester City.

Early life
Barnes was born in Burnley, Lancashire, and brought up in Countesthorpe, Leicestershire. He is the son of former professional footballer Paul Barnes. He is of Scottish descent through his grandparents. In 2009, Barnes played for Greenfield Primary School in the Leicestershire & Rutland Schools Football Association competition known as The Rice Bowl. After leaving Greenfield, he attended Leysland High School and Countesthorpe College.

Club career

Leicester City

Youth career
Barnes is a product of the Leicester City academy, which he joined on 8 June 2007 at the age of nine. He signed his first professional contract with the club on 25 June 2016 and on 7 December 2016 made his debut for the first team as a second-half substitute in a 5–0 UEFA Champions League defeat to Porto. During the first half of the 2016–17 Premier League 2 season for Leicester City U23, Barnes scored five goals and provided assists for five others.

Loan to Milton Keynes Dons
On 20 January 2017, Barnes joined League One club Milton Keynes Dons on loan for the remainder of the 2016–17 season. A day later, Barnes scored on his home debut as a 76th-minute substitute for Chuks Aneke in a 5–3 win over Northampton Town. Barnes followed his debut goal with another goal a week later, on 28 January, scoring in a 4–0 away win over rivals Peterborough United.

On 2 May 2017, after impressing with 6 goals in 21 appearances for the club, he was awarded Milton Keynes Dons' Young Player of the Year 2016–17 award.

On 21 July 2017, Barnes signed a new four-year contract, keeping him at Leicester until June 2021.

Loan to Barnsley and recall
On 11 August 2017, Barnes joined Championship club Barnsley on a season-long loan. The following day, he made his debut for the club as an 80th-minute substitute in a 1–2 home defeat to Ipswich Town. He scored his first goal for Barnsley against Sunderland on 26 August 2017.

On 1 January 2018, Barnes was recalled from his loan spell at Barnsley and returned to Leicester City.

He made his Premier League debut on 19 April 2018, as a 91st minute substitute in a 0–0 draw against Southampton.

Loan to West Bromwich Albion
In July 2018, after originally agreeing a deal to join Leeds United on loan, Barnes changed his mind at the last moment and on 24 July 2018, Barnes signed a new four-year contract with Leicester and joined newly relegated Championship club West Bromwich Albion on a season long loan. He scored a spectacular goal on his league debut during a 2–1 home defeat against Bolton Wanderers on 4 August 2018.

Return to Leicester City
On 11 January 2019, Barnes was recalled by Leicester with immediate effect. He scored his first goal for Leicester on 20 April in a 2–2 draw with West Ham United. In June he signed a new five-year contract. On 24 August 2019, Barnes scored a half-volley against Sheffield United to give Leicester City the victory. That stunning strike was later voted as Premier League Goal of the Month.

He scored again for Leicester's opener on 19 January 2020, but he was on the losing side as his team lost 2–1 to Burnley at Turf Moor. On 9 March, Barnes notched a brace in a comprehensive 4–0 home victory over struggling Aston Villa.

On 19 August 2021, Barnes signed a new 4 year contract at Leicester City, keeping him at the club until 2025.

International career
Barnes was called up as one of six over-age players for the England under-18 squad entered into the 2017 Toulon Tournament. He made his debut on 29 May 2017, featuring as a substitute in a 1–0 win over group rivals Angola. On 1 June 2017, Barnes scored twice in a 7–1 win over Cuba. On 8 June 2017, Barnes scored another brace in the competition's semi-final, in a 3–0 win over Scotland, and on 10 June 2017 went on to score his penalty in a penalty shoot-out during the final against the Ivory Coast, with England being victorious. Overall, Barnes finished the tournament as joint recipient of the Golden Boot (top scorer) award with four goals along with teammate George Hirst and Angola's Chico Banza.

On 28 September 2017, Barnes was called up to the England under-20 team, and on 5 October 2017 featured as a substitute in a 5–1 away friendly win over Italy.

On 27 May 2019, Barnes was included in England's 23-man squad for the 2019 UEFA European Under-21 Championship.

On 1 October 2020, Barnes was called-up to the senior England team for the first time. He made his England debut as a 76th minute substitute in a 3–0 victory over Wales.

Career statistics

Club

International

Honours
Leicester City
FA Community Shield: 2021

England U18
Toulon Tournament: 2017

Individual
Toulon Tournament Golden Boot: 2017
Toulon Tournament Best XI: 2017
Leicester City Development Squad Player of the Year: 2016–17
Milton Keynes Dons Young Player of the Year: 2016–17
Premier League Goal of the Month: August 2019

References

External links

Profile at the Leicester City F.C. website
Profile at the Football Association website

1997 births
Living people
Footballers from Burnley
People from Countesthorpe
Footballers from Leicestershire
English footballers
Association football wingers
Leicester City F.C. players
Barnsley F.C. players
Milton Keynes Dons F.C. players
West Bromwich Albion F.C. players
English Football League players
Premier League players
England youth international footballers
England under-21 international footballers
England international footballers
English people of Scottish descent